David Gordon Crawford  (10 June 1928 – 6 September 1981) was a British diplomat who was ambassador to Qatar and to Bahrain.

Career
Crawford was educated at Ashford Grammar School (The Norton Knatchbull School) and the London School of Economics. He served in the Royal Army Educational Corps 1947–55 and joined the Diplomatic Service in 1956. He studied at the Middle East Centre for Arabic Studies, then served at Taiz, Bahrain, New York, Amman and at the Foreign Office (later the Foreign and Commonwealth Office, FCO). He was Consul-General at Muscat 1969–71, head of Accommodation and Services at the FCO 1971–74, Ambassador to Qatar 1974–78, Consul-General at Atlanta 1978–81, and was appointed Ambassador at Bahrain in August 1981. However, he died of a stroke at Bahrain only a month after taking up the post.

Crawford was appointed CMG in the Queen's Birthday Honours of 1981.

References
CRAWFORD, David Gordon, Who Was Who, A & C Black, 1920–2007; online edn, Oxford University Press, Dec 2007

1928 births
1981 deaths
People educated at The Norton Knatchbull School
Alumni of the London School of Economics
Royal Army Educational Corps officers
Ambassadors of the United Kingdom to Qatar
Ambassadors of the United Kingdom to Bahrain
Companions of the Order of St Michael and St George
Ambassadors of the United Kingdom to Oman
20th-century British Army personnel